Middlebury Township is one of the twenty-two townships of Knox County, Ohio, United States.  The 2010 census found 1,278 people in the township.

Geography
Located in the northwestern corner of the county, it borders the following townships:
Perry Township, Richland County - north
Jefferson Township, Richland County - northeast
Berlin Township - east
Morris Township - southeast corner
Wayne Township - south
Chester Township, Morrow County - southwest corner
Franklin Township, Morrow County - west
Perry Township, Morrow County - northwest

A small part of the village of Fredericktown is located in southeastern Middlebury Township.

Name and history
Middlebury Township was established in 1823. It was originally settled chiefly by Quakers from Frederick County, Maryland.

It is the only Middlebury Township statewide.

Government
The township is governed by a three-member board of trustees, who are elected in November of odd-numbered years to a four-year term beginning on the following January 1. Two are elected in the year after the presidential election and one is elected in the year before it. There is also an elected township fiscal officer, who serves a four-year term beginning on April 1 of the year after the election, which is held in November of the year before the presidential election. Vacancies in the fiscal officership or on the board of trustees are filled by the remaining trustees.

References

External links
County website

Townships in Knox County, Ohio
Townships in Ohio